Andrew Gray (born 25 October 1973) is an English former professional footballer who played in the Football League, as a forward.

Biography
Born in Southampton, Gray began his career as a trainee at Reading and signed for the club on 3 July 1992. After making seventeen league appearances for Reading, he signed for Leyton Orient on 20 July 1994 on a free transfer. He remained at Orient for two seasons, making 32 league appearances and scoring three goals. He was loaned to non-League Enfield in February 1996, and in March 1996 he was signed by Slough Town for a fee of £5,000. He later played for Wokingham Town and Henley Town

References

1973 births
Living people
Footballers from Southampton
English footballers
Association football forwards
Reading F.C. players
Leyton Orient F.C. players
Enfield F.C. players
Slough Town F.C. players
Wokingham Town F.C. players
Henley Town F.C. players
English Football League players
National League (English football) players